The St. Louis Missouri Temple is the 50th operating temple of the Church of Jesus Christ of Latter-day Saints (LDS Church).  It is located in Town and Country, Missouri, a St. Louis suburb.

History
LDS Church president Gordon B. Hinckley broke ground for the temple on October 30, 1993. A public open house was held April 26 – May 17, 1997. The temple was dedicated on June 1, 1997.

Gallery

See also

 Menlo F. Smith, first temple president
 Comparison of temples of The Church of Jesus Christ of Latter-day Saints
 List of temples of The Church of Jesus Christ of Latter-day Saints
 List of temples of The Church of Jesus Christ of Latter-day Saints by geographic region
 Temple architecture (Latter-day Saints)
 The Church of Jesus Christ of Latter-day Saints in Missouri

References

External links
 
St. Louis Missouri Temple Temple Official site
St. Louis Missouri Temple at ChurchofJesusChristTemples.org

20th-century Latter Day Saint temples
Religious buildings and structures in St. Louis County, Missouri
Temples (LDS Church) in the United States
The Church of Jesus Christ of Latter-day Saints in Missouri
1997 establishments in Missouri
Tourist attractions in St. Louis
Buildings and structures in St. Louis County, Missouri